Lucy Cavendish College is a constituent college of the University of Cambridge.

The college is named in honour of Lucy Cavendish (1841–1925), who campaigned for the reform of women's education.

History
The college was founded in 1965 by female academics of the University of Cambridge who believed that the university offered too few and too restricted opportunities for women as either students or academics. Its origins are traceable to the Society of Women Members of the Regent House who are not Fellows of Colleges (informally known as the Dining Group) which in the 1950s sought to provide the benefits of collegiality to its members who, being female, were not college fellows. At the time there were only two women's colleges in Cambridge, Girton and Newnham, insufficient for the large and growing numbers of female academic staff in the university.

The college was named in honour of Lucy Caroline Cavendish, a pioneer of women's education and the great aunt of one of its founders, Margaret Braithwaite. First formally recognised as the Lucy Cavendish Collegiate Society, it moved to its current site in 1970, received consent to be called Lucy Cavendish College in 1986, and gained the status of a full college of the university by Royal Charter in 1997.

The first president of the college, from 1965 to 1970, was Anna McClean Bidder, one of the founding members of the Dining Group and a zoologist specialising in cephalopod digestion; this accounts for the presence of the nautilus shell in the college coat of arms. She was succeeded by Kate Bertram until 1979, Phyllis Hetzel (Lady Bowden), Dame Anne Warburton, Baroness Perry of Southwark, Dame Veronica Sutherland, Janet Todd and Jackie Ashley. The current and ninth president of Lucy Cavendish is Madeleine Atkins, who took up the post in 2018.

With effect from October 2021, Lucy Cavendish has admitted both women and men from the standard university age. The college gave as its primary reason for the change "to grow graduate and undergraduate numbers to support the University and the other colleges in making more places available for excellent students from under-represented backgrounds." The mission of the college was to open the Cambridge door to talented and exceptional students from under-represented and non-traditional backgrounds. Lucy Cavendish, uniquely in Cambridge, became broadly representative in its UK student body of the UK's national society. On 4 December 2019 the college appointed its first male fellows. In the 2022 admission cycle, Lucy Cavendish became the first University of Cambridge college to admit more than 90% of its undergraduates from state schools.

College site 
For the first few years of the college's existence it occupied rooms first in Silver Street and then in Northampton Street. In 1970 it moved to its current site on the corner of Madingley Road and Lady Margaret Road, near Westminster College and St John's College, which had provided some of the land.

In 1991 the college bought Balliol Croft, a neighbouring house to its grounds and former home of the economist Alfred Marshall and his wife Mary Paley Marshall, with whom he wrote his first economics textbook.  The building was renamed Marshall House in his honour and used for student accommodation until 2001 when it was converted back to its original layout and used as the President's Lodge. Meanwhile, the majority of the college's buildings, including Warburton Hall and the library, were completed in the 1990s.

The college is primarily situated on a site just north-west of central Cambridge bounded by Madingley Road and Lady Margaret Road. It is currently based around three converted 19th century villas and a new eco-friendly and accessible Passivhaus building, with facilities including student accommodation, porters’ lodge, library, teaching rooms, dining hall, gym, social spaces and a large café/bar. The new accommodation building meets and exceeds the Passivhaus standard and 100% of the college's electricity is supplied by renewables. In 2022 the college received the Platinum Award for Green Impact, the highest award offered by the United Nations’ programme for environmentally and socially sustainable practice.

There is on-site accommodation for 235 students with a further 98 rooms (including 10 flats) owned by the college near its main site, primarily at its new student centre at 100 Histon Road which was opened in 2014. In order to provide more accommodation, the college also rents neighbouring properties from St John's College and at Mount Pleasant Halls, which together provide a further 114 rooms and flats.

Student body 
Lucy Cavendish has over 900 students, approximately 40% of whom are undergraduates and 60% graduates. Students originate from over 85 different countries, making it a distinctly international college. The college website states that "Students from every corner of the UK mix with students from around the world. Students with 'Access' qualifications interact with students who have studied for A-levels and the International Baccalaureate.

The 2020 intake had 74% of new entrants that came from under-represented groups, compared to an average across the University of 64%. The 2021 intake has recorded an intake of 78% of new UK students from state schools or FE colleges compared to the University average of 70%. The 2022 intake has recorded an intake of 91.1% of new UK students from state schools or FE colleges compared to the University average of 90%.

Lucy Cavendish students are also called "Lucians".

Academic performance 
The percentage of undergraduate/postgraduate students achieving 2.1 or 1st class honours degrees was 97% of all students eligible during 2020.

Clubs and societies
Students are encouraged to join some of the hundreds of clubs and societies across the university and in their academic department, in order to have a healthy life balance that makes them more successful as students and brings them friendships and contacts they wouldn't otherwise have had. There is currently an art society, two choirs, a sewing and knitting society, a student magazine, the Lucy Cavendish College Boat Club, and teams for badminton, football and netball. There are societies based on the course (Tripos) such as Lucy Lawyers and the VetMed Society, with their programmes of talks, visits and social events.

Lucy Cavendish Fiction Prize 
The college hosts an important annual national prize for fiction, the Lucy Cavendish Fiction Prize, open to women novelists over the age of 18 years who have not yet been published. It was founded by Janet Todd. The Prize has launched numerous literary careers with a number of shortlisted writers seeing commercial success. Alongside the Fiction Prize, the college has run writing short courses with subsidies for those from low-income backgrounds, runs writing prizes for current students and prospective students, and supported the establishment of the innovative virtual “ Lucy Writers’ Platform” that provides opportunities for budding non-fiction writers, journalists, and others to build a profile. Fiction Prize winners include Gail Honeyman Eleanor Oliphant is Completely Fine and Claire Askew.

List of presidents

Notable alumnae 

 Noeleen Heyzer, Under-Secretary-General of the United Nations and executive director of UNIFEM
 Rosena Allin-Khan, Member of Parliament for Tooting since 2016.

Honorary Fellows
 Jackie Ashley
 Carol M. Black
 Margaret Burbidge
 Shami Chakrabarti (2 March 2017)
 Jane Clarke
 Dame Judi Dench
 Janet Neel Cohen, Baroness Cohen of Pimlico
 Anna Ford
 Edwina Dunn
 Cynthia Glassman
 Sophie Hannah
 Judith Hanratty
 Helena Kennedy, Baroness Kennedy of The Shaws
 Dame Pauline Harris
 Queen Margrethe of Denmark
 Jane McNeill QC
 Martina Navratilova
 Dame Anne Owers
 Pauline Perry, Baroness Perry of Southwark
 Nirmala Rao
 Alison Richard
 Dame Stella Rimington
 Sarah Sands
 Ali Smith
 Veronica Sutherland
 Dame Cath Tizard
 Janet Todd
 Sandi Toksvig
 Claire Tomalin

References

External links

 Official college website
 Admissions info for Lucy Cavendish College
 Lucy Cavendish College Students' Union
 History of Lucy Cavendish College

 
Colleges of the University of Cambridge
Women's universities and colleges in the United Kingdom
Educational institutions established in 1965
1965 establishments in England